The Bob Edwards Show was an American radio program broadcast from 2004 to 2014 by Sirius XM Satellite Radio every weekday morning at 8 a.m. Eastern, with repeats at 8 a.m. Central, 7 a.m. Pacific, 6 p.m. Mountain, and the next day at 7 a.m. Eastern. The program was heard on the Sirius XM Public Radio station at XM channel 121 and Sirius channel 205, and was also available 24/7 on XM Radio Online and Sirius Internet Radio.

The show was hosted by Bob Edwards, a Peabody Award-winning member of the National Radio Hall of Fame.  Edwards was once the co-host of National Public Radio's All Things Considered, and hosted NPR's Morning Edition from the first episode to April 30, 2004 when he was reassigned to another position within NPR, despite email objections from more than 50,000 listeners. Edwards left his new assignment almost immediately, as Hugh Panero, CEO of XM Radio, offered Edwards a daily show.

The Bob Edwards Show continued the tradition of interviewing interesting people in all walks of life that Edwards exemplified on Morning Edition, but now in long form. Edwards told the NewsHour with Jim Lehrers Terrance Smith, "The longest interview I could do on the air for Morning Edition was eight minutes. Now I can interview someone for up to an hour. So it's a freer, more open, more relaxed and enjoyable conversation. The program's really about conversation." The show's first broadcast was on October 4, 2004, staffed by experienced public radio veterans. The first program included weekly political commentator Washington Post columnist David S. Broder, USA Today Supreme Court reporter Joan Biskupic, former CBS News anchor Walter Cronkite, and Eugene Robinson, author of Last Dance in Havana.

Sirius XM Radio also produced the compilation program Bob Edwards Weekend, distributed by Public Radio International for use by "terrestrial" public radio stations. It premiered on January 7–8, 2006, consisting of re-edited interviews from the weekday program.

The show's last live episode aired on September 26, 2014. Public Radio International, which paid Sirius XM to broadcast the show on weekends, continued to air reruns, but no longer does.

Awards and recognitions
In 2006, interviews with musicians earned The Bob Edwards Show the Deems Taylor Award from ASCAP.  The program also received a Gabriel Award from the Catholic Academy for Communication Arts Professionals for an interview with Father Gregory Boyle, a Jesuit priest who works with Latino gang members in east Los Angeles.  The show earned a second Gabriel Award in 2007 for "Exploding Heritage," a documentary about mountaintop removal coal mining in Appalachia.  "Exploding Heritage" also received the National Press Club's Robert L. Kozic Award for environmental reporting, a New York Festivals Gold World Medal for best program on the environment, and an award from the Society of Environmental Journalists.   In 2008, The Bob Edwards Show received an Edward R. Murrow Award from the Radio-Television News Directors Association and a New York Festivals/United Nations Gold Award for a documentary called "The Invisible—Children Without Homes."  "The Invisible" also was honored by the Journalism Center on Children and Families and by the Catholic Academy for Communication Arts Professionals. In 2009, the show received a Sigma Delta Chi Award from the Society of Professional Journalists for the documentary, "Stories from Third Med: Surviving a Jungle ER."  The documentary also earned a Gabriel Award.  In 2013, Bob's program was awarded a Robert F. Kennedy Journalism Award for the documentary, "An Occupational Hazard: Rape in the Military."

Personnel

Host
Bob Edwards (2004–2014)

Executive producer
Mark Schramm (2004–2005)
Tish Valva (2005–2007)
Steve Lickteig (2007–2011)
Ed McNulty (2011– )

Production staff
Dan Bloom
Chad Campbell
Andy Danyo
Ed McNulty
Cristy Meiners
Ariana Pekary
Geoffrey Redick
Shelley Tillman
Kim Dawson

References

External links
 XMradio.com: Official 'Bob Edwards Show website (archived)
 Bob Edwards Radio.com website
 BobEdwards.info: Discussion forum for The Bob Edwards Show — includes complete calendar of guests to date, staff bios, and photos.
 BobEdwards.info: Bob Edwards Bio

American talk radio programs
Radio programs on XM Satellite Radio
Internet radio in the United States
2004 radio programme debuts 
2014 radio programme endings